Datuk Seri Panglima Dr. Maximus Johnity Ongkili (born 26 October 1953) is a Malaysian politician who has served as Chairman of the Energy Commission of Sabah (ECOS) since February 2023. He served as Minister in the Prime Minister's Department for Sabah and Sarawak Affairs for the second term in the Barisan Nasional (BN) administration under former Prime Minister Ismail Sabri Yaakob from August 2021 to the collapse of the BN administration in November 2022, the first term in the Perikatan Nasional (PN) administration under former Prime Minister Muhyiddin Yassin from March 2020 to August 2021 as well as for National Unity and Integration in the Barisan Nasional (BN) administration under former Prime Minister Abdullah Ahmad Badawi from March 2004 to March 2008 and the Minister of Energy, Green Technology and Water in the BN administration under former Prime Minister Najib Razak from May 2013 to May 2018, Member of Parliament (MP) for Kota Marudu from March 2004 to November 2022 and for Bandau from April 1995 to March 2004. He is the 2nd President and a member of the United Sabah Party (PBS), a component party of the United Alliance and the ruling PN coalitions.

Personal life 
Ongkili was born on 26 October 1953 in Kota Kinabalu but hails from the district of Tambunan in the interior part of the state. He is married with two children and has a Doctor of Philosophy in Agricultural Economics, conferred by Australia's La Trobe University. He is a Christian of Borneo Evangelical Church. Ongkili is the nephew of former Sabah Deputy Chief Minister Joseph Pairin Kitingan and Sabah Deputy Chief Minister II Jeffrey Kitingan, who is the President of the Homeland Solidarity Party (STAR).

Political career

In the Opposition 
Ongkili was originally an opposition politician but joined the government when the PBS joined the Barisan Nasional (BN) coalition in 2002.

In 1991, he was imprisoned under the Internal Security Act for 59 days. This was part of political arrests carried out between 1990 and 1991 to crack down on opposition leaders in Sabah, Malaysia, and their alleged plans to secede the state from Malaysia, allegedly known as Operation Talkak. Seven men were detained under the Internal Security Act (ISA). (See also 1991 Sabah political arrests).

At the time of his arrest on 3 January 1991, Ongkili was a senior researcher and deputy chief director of IDS and electoral press consultant to then Chief Minister of Sabah Joseph Pairin Kitingan during the 1990 Sabah state and national elections. He was released unconditionally on 2 March.

In the Government 
Ongkili entered Parliament in the 1995 general election (at the time, the Kota Marudu seat was named Bandau). He was appointed as a Minister in the Prime Minister's Department after the 2004 election by Prime Minister Mahathir Mohamad's successor Abdullah Ahmad Badawi. Ongkili was placed in charge of National Unity, and headed the initiation of the Khidmat Negara conscription program.

Ongkili was also a member of the Sabah State Legislative Assembly until the 2008 election, when he stood aside from his Tandek seat.

In 2008, Ongkili became the Minister of Science, Technology, and Innovation. Then after his winning in the 2013 general election, Ongkili has been appointed as Energy, Green Technology and Water Minister.

Election results

Honours
  :
  Grand Commander of the Order of Malacca (DGSM) - Datuk Seri (2009)
  :
  Commander of the Order of Kinabalu (PGDK) - Datuk (2002)
  Grand Commander of the Order of Kinabalu (SPDK) - Datuk Seri Panglima (2011)

References 

Grand Commanders of the Order of Kinabalu
1953 births
Malaysian Christians
Government ministers of Malaysia
Malaysian Protestants
People from Sabah
Living people
Kadazan-Dusun people
Members of the Dewan Rakyat
United Sabah Party politicians
La Trobe University alumni
People from Kota Kinabalu
Commanders of the Order of Kinabalu